Mpanda may refer to:
Burundi
 Commune of Mpanda, Bubanza Province
 Mpanda, Gihanga, a village in the Commune of Gihanga, Bubanza Province
 Mpanda, Mpanda, a town in the Commune of Mpanda, Bubanza Province

Tanzania
 Mpanda, a city in Katavi Region
 Mpanda District, in Katavi Region
 Roman Catholic Diocese of Mpanda